Natalia Igorevna Bessmertnova (Russian: Наталья Игоревна Бессмертнова;  – ) was a Soviet prima ballerina of the Bolshoi Ballet and a People's Artist of the USSR (1976).

Life
Natalia Bessmertnova was born in Moscow in 1941 and trained at the Moscow State Academy of Choreography from 1953-61. Among her teachers were Sofia Golovkina and Marina Semyonova. She graduated in 1961 as the first student in the school's history receiving A+ in the final examinations. In 1963, she joined the Bolshoi Ballet and was its prima ballerina for three decades. She was married to Yury Grigorovich, former Director and Chief choreographer of the Bolshoi. When he was forced to leave the Bolshoi in 1995, she took part in a historic strike which led to cancellations of scheduled performances.

Bessmertnova died in Moscow on 19 February 2008, aged 66, from cancer. Her sister Tatyana (born 1947) was also a ballet dancer.

Title roles
 Giselle in Lavrovsky's 1963 Giselle production
 Leyli in Goleizovsky's  1964
 Anastasia in Grigorovich's Ivan the Terrible 1975
 Valentina in Grigorovich's  1976
 Juliet in Grigorovich's new Romeo and Juliet 1979
 Rita in Grigorovich's The Golden Age in 1982
 Raymonda in Grigorovich's new Raymonda production 1984
 Giselle in Grigorovich's Giselle in 1991

Other important roles
 Phrygia in Spartacus
 Odette-Odile in Swan Lake
 Shirin in Legend of Love
 Kitri in Don Quixote
 Maria in The Fountain of Bakhchisarai
 The girl in Le Spectre de la rose

Awards
 Gold Medal at Varna International Ballet Competition in 1965.
 The Anna Pavlova Prize in Paris 1970.
 USSR State Prize (1977) and Lenin Prize (1986).
 People's Artist of the USSR in 1976.

See also
 List of Russian ballet dancers

References

External links

The Ballerina Gallery - Natalia Bessmertnova
The Gallery of Masters of Musical Theatre - Natalia Bessmertnova

1941 births
2008 deaths
Moscow State Academy of Choreography alumni
Tenth convocation members of the Supreme Soviet of the Soviet Union
Honored Artists of the RSFSR
People's Artists of the RSFSR
People's Artists of the USSR
Lenin Prize winners
Recipients of the Lenin Komsomol Prize
Recipients of the Order of Friendship of Peoples
Recipients of the Order of the Red Banner of Labour
Recipients of the USSR State Prize
Writers from Moscow
Prima ballerinas
Russian ballerinas
Russian women
Soviet ballerinas
Deaths from cancer in Russia
Burials at Novodevichy Cemetery
20th-century Russian ballet dancers